Poás Volcano National Park is a national park in Costa Rica that covers an area of approximately ; the summit is . It was established on 25 January 1971. Depending on conditions, visitors can walk all the way to the edge of the main crater, but on 13 April 2017 the park was closed to visitors due to an explosive eruption on the evening of 12 April. Still further eruptions, including on Easter, 16 April, caused the park to be closed until August 2018.

Over the years, the park has been frequently closed to visitors due to precautions because of water vapor and sulfuric acid gas emissions. The status of the park being subject to change, potential visitors should check the current conditions at the park. Poas Volcano erupted twice briefly in September 2019.

The volcano is located in the Central Conservation Area located in the Alajuela Province near the Pacific coast of Costa Rica, which encompasses the area around the Poás Volcano. Two more craters make up parts of the park, the extinct Von Frantzuis crater and the Botos crater. The Botos crater has not erupted for about 7,500 years. Well-marked trails lead to the two inactive craters, conditions permitting.

Flora and fauna
The park maintains a variety of wild plant and animal species, such as the Poas magnolia bird species, including the clay-colored robin, black guan, resplendent quetzal and varieties of hummingbirds, tanagers, flycatchers and toucans. Mammals within the park include coyotes, rabbits, and marmots.

See also
 List of national parks of Costa Rica
 List of volcanoes in Costa Rica
 Tourism in Costa Rica

References

External links 

 

Geography of Alajuela Province
National parks of Costa Rica
Protected areas established in 1971
Tourist attractions in Alajuela Province
Talamancan montane forests